The 2013 Women's Cricket World Cup Final was a cricket match between the West Indies and Australia played on 17 February 2013 at the Brabourne Stadium in India. It was the culmination of the 2013 Women's Cricket World Cup, the tenth Women's Cricket World Cup.

Australia batted first, making a total of 259 runs for 7 wickets.  In response, the West Indies were bowled out for 145, resulting in an Australian victory by 114 runs and securing Australia's sixth World Cup victory.

Route to the final

Australia were drawn in Group B along with Pakistan, New Zealand and South Africa.  In their first match, Australia defeated Pakistan by 91 runs, before winning their second match by three wickets (with 26 balls to spare) against South Africa.  The final group match saw Australia beat New Zealand by seven wicket, and see them qualify for the Super Six section of the tournament.  A narrow two-run victory over England was followed by a nine-wicket win against Sri Lanka and an eight-run defeat by the West Indies.

The West Indies were drawn in Group A along with India, England and Sri Lanka.  Despite losing to India and England, they finished in third place in the group and qualified for the Super Six section, where they won all three of their games, against South Africa, New Zealand and Australia, to qualify for the final.

Final

Scorecard

Australian innings
Australia won the toss and chose to bat first.  Openers Meg Lanning and Rachael Haynes put on 52 for the first wicket, and Haynes went on to share a stand of 64 with Jess Cameron before being caught off the bowling of Shanel Daley for 52. Jess Cameron then accelerated the scoring, making 75 from 76 balls before also falling to Daley.  The West Indies then took further wickets until at 209/7 with fewer than 7 overs left, Australia appeared to have lost their momentum. However Jodie Fields and Ellyse Perry hit 50 more runs off the remaining balls, leaving Australia with a final score of 259/7.

West Indies innings
The West Indian innings never really got going; openers Kycia Knight and Natasha McLean scored 32 before both being dismissed by Perry, and West Indies quickly found themselves struggling at 57/3, with Kyshona Knight also having retired hurt.  Despite contributions from their middle order to reach 109/4, they then lost their next four wickets for five runs and were eventually dismissed for 145, giving Australia a victory by 114 runs.

Analysis and reaction
Most commentators saw Ellyse Perry as the match-winner.  Apart from her fast 25 runs in the Australian innings, she then "wrecked West Indies' chase" with her spell of 3/19. Despite the margin of victory, it was pointed out that the result was not unexpected; as ESPN reported "it was no surprise and indeed no shame for West Indies to be outclassed by a team that lost just one of seven games, that too, by eight runs." The West Indies had beaten Australia in the Super Six group stage, but were outclassed in the final; the BBC said that "Australia were too clinical for a West Indies side that were sloppy in the field, wayward with the ball and unable to keep up with the run chase."

Scorecard

Australia innings

West Indies innings

Key
 * – Captain
  – Wicket-keeper
 c Fielder – Indicates that the batsman was dismissed by a catch by the named fielder
 b Bowler – Indicates which bowler gains credit for the dismissal
 lbw – Indicates the batsman was dismissed leg before wicket

References

!
Women's Cricket World Cup finals
World Cup
World Cup
World Cup 2013
World Cup 2013